Two ships of the Royal Navy have borne the name HMS Vimiera, an alternative spelling of Vimeiro in Portugal, site of the Battle of Vimeiro. A third ship was planned, but was later renamed:

  was a 16-gun brig-sloop, formerly the French Pylade, launched in 1805. She was captured in 1808 and sold in 1814.
  was an Admiralty V-class destroyer launched in 1917 and sunk by a mine in 1942.

Royal Navy ship names